Code of the Lawless is a 1945 American Western film directed by Wallace Fox and written by Patricia Harper. The film stars Kirby Grant, Fuzzy Knight, Poni Adams, Hugh Prosser, Barbara Sears and Edward Howard. The film was released on October 19, 1945, by Universal Pictures.

Plot

A disreputable holding company has been robbing ranchers by imposing fraudulent taxes. The story's hero, Grant Carter (Kirby Grant) impersonates a long lost son, Chad Hiltonof, of the man who runs the company. Carter eventually reveals himself to be a U. S. Department of the Interior agent, and brings down the bad guys. In the end, he also captures the heart of a postmistress, Julie Randall (Jane Adams).

Cast        
Kirby Grant as Grant Carter 
Fuzzy Knight as Ezzarius 'Bonanza' Featherstone
Poni Adams as Julie Randall 
Hugh Prosser as Lester Ward
Barbara Sears as Ruth Monroe
Edward Howard as Bart Rogan 
Stanley Andrews as Chadwick Hilton Sr.
Rune Hultman as Chadwick Hilton Jr.

References

External links
 

1945 films
American Western (genre) films
1945 Western (genre) films
Universal Pictures films
Films directed by Wallace Fox
American black-and-white films
1940s English-language films
1940s American films